Atractodes is a genus of parasitoid wasps belonging to the family Ichneumonidae.

The genus was first described by Gravenhorst in 1829.

Species:
 Atractodes angustipennis
 Atractodes croceicornis
 Atractodes ficticius
 Atractodes gilvipes
 Atractodes pauxillus

References

Ichneumonidae
Ichneumonidae genera